The Ruminator Review, originally the Hungry Mind Review, was a quarterly book review magazine founded by David Unowsky and published in St. Paul, Minnesota from 1986 to 2005.  It included reviews  of all genres, as well as literary interviews, focusing on work published by smaller presses.  It was distributed freely through independent bookstores in the United States.

The review was part of a "creative partnership" centered on the Ruminator Books bookstore at Macalester College, including the bookstore and its independent press, Ruminator Press.

History

Hungry Mind Bookstore and Review 
The Hungry Mind Bookstore was opened in 1970 in St. Paul by Unowsky. In 1972 it moved onto Macalester College campus to become the university bookstore.

By the 1980s, the bookstore had become well known in the region, and was becoming a hub for literary activity.  Unowsky helped start a regional booksellers' association.  In 1986 he launched the Hungry Mind Review as a critical literary journal, with founding editor Bart Schneider.  The review attracted some high-profile writers and reviewers, such as Robert Bly, Andrei Codrescu, Jane Hamilton and Arundhati Roy.

Hungry Minds Press 
In 1995, in response to the disappearance of backlists from the catalogs of traditional publishers' catalogs, Unowsky and his wife started their own independent press, with three partners.  Over the next nine years they published 50 titles, calling them "Hungry Mind Finds" or "Ruminator Finds". These included:

 Black Tents of Arabia, Carl R. Raswan
 A Book of Own's Own: People and Their Diaries, Thomas Mallon
 Days and Nights in Calcutta,  Clark Blaise and Bharati Mukherjee
 A False Spring, Pat Jordan
 The Soul of the Night: An Astronomical Pilgrimage, Chet Raymo
 Laughing in the Hills, Bill Barich
 Moonshine: A Life in Pursuit of White Liquor, Alec Wilkinson
 Our Like Will Not Be There Again: Notes from the West of Ireland, Lawrence Millman
 A Passage to Ararat, Michael J. Arlen
 The Tree Farm: Replanting a Life, Robert Treuer

Ruminator name change 
In 2000, the Hungry Mind sold its name to Hungry Minds, Inc. (see the paragraph about IDG Books/Hungry Minds at Hungry Minds#Business), publisher of the For Dummies books. After soliciting ideas from its patrons, it became Ruminator Books, Review, and Press.

In 2001 Margaret Maitland became editor of the Review.  In 2004, behind on its rent to the university, the bookstore went out of business.  The Ruminator Review continued for another year, but published its last issue in Fall 2005.

References

1986 establishments in Minnesota
2005 disestablishments in Minnesota
Quarterly magazines published in the United States
Book review magazines
Defunct literary magazines published in the United States
Magazines established in 1986
Magazines disestablished in 2005
Magazines published in Minnesota